The Roald Dahl Omnibus is a 1986 short story collection by Roald Dahl.

The collection contains 28 stories selected from Switch Bitch, Kiss, Kiss, and Someone Like You – a collection of Dahl stories published in various magazines and collections from the 1940s onward.

References

1986 short story collections
Short story collections by Roald Dahl